Magnolia doltsopa is a large shrub or small tree native to the eastern Himalayan region and the Meghalaya subtropical forests in Northeastern India. The wood is fragrant.

Description
The tree flowers in spring and produces heavily scented white flowers. It has long leathery and glossy dark-green leaves,  in length, that provide a point of interest all year long. The wood is a rich brown. It grows in evergreen broad-leaved forests.

The "Silver Cloud" variety grows to 15 feet and flowers earlier in its lifespan.

Cultivation
Magnolia doltsopa is used as a featured ornamental tree and street tree, or pruned as a hedge.  It enjoys a sheltered position in full or part sun, and appreciates well drained soil. It can tolerate acidic soil.

Global distribution and use

In Nepal, the wood of the Magnolia doltsopa is used for house building. It is also used for house building in Bhutan, where in the 1980s it suffered from over-harvesting.

The Magnolia doltsopa is useful in a Shifting cultivation system, which relies on species with good nitrogen fixation in soil.

References

doltsopa
Trees of China
Flora of Assam (region)
Trees of Bangladesh
Flora of East Himalaya
Trees of Myanmar
Garden plants of Asia
Ornamental trees
Trees of Nepal